is a city located in Kagoshima Prefecture, Japan. The city was founded on October 1, 1958.

As of April 2017, the city has an estimated population of 14,847 and a population density of 92 persons per km². The total area is 162.12 km².

History 
In February 1944, the Tarumizu Maru, a passenger ferry, set sail for Kagoshima and capsized within minutes. 466 passengers were reported dead.

References

External links
 Tarumizu City official website 
 Kagoshima Prefectural Visitors Bureau official website 
 
 

Cities in Kagoshima Prefecture